Graham Thomas Moodie (born 15 January 1981 in Croydon, London) is a Scottish field hockey player, who was a member of the Great Britain and Northern Ireland squad that finished ninth at the 2004 Summer Olympics in Athens.  Graham has amassed 56 Great Britain senior caps and 148 Scotland Senior caps representing Scotland at 2 Commonwealth Games (2006 & 2010) and 6 European Championships.

The midfielder, started playing hockey at primary school at eleven years old. His brothers Alan and Ian also competed for East of Scotland up to U18 and U15 respectively. Moodie played for Inverleith, MIM, Western Wildcats, Western Territory Stingers, Cannock and for Stirling University in BUSA (British University Championships).  He was also player coach of the University of Edinburgh from 2009 to 2014, before becoming Head of Performance Men's Hockey until 2021.

Since 2012 Graham has been the Head coach of the Scotland U21 Men's programme and an assistant coach for Scotland Senior Men.  Graham is also an assistant coach on the Men's Great Britain Elite Development programme and a partner in Complete Hockey Coaching.

References

External links
 

1981 births
Anglo-Scots
Field hockey players at the 2004 Summer Olympics
Field hockey players at the 2006 Commonwealth Games
Living people
Olympic field hockey players of Great Britain
British male field hockey players
People from Croydon
Scottish male field hockey players
Cannock Hockey Club players
Commonwealth Games competitors for Scotland